= Evelyn Pennak =

- Evelyn Pennak in a 1938 promotional portrait.

Background information
- Born: Evelyn Marie Pennak; April 4, 1915; Milwaukee, Wisconsin, U.S.
- Died: December 21, 1994 (aged 79) Los Angeles, California, U.S.
- Genres: Jazz, Big band, swing
- Occupations: Musician, music educator
- Instrument: Saxophone

Evelyn Marie Pennak (April 4, 1915 – December 21, 1994) was an American jazz and big band saxophonist prominent during the swing era. She performed as a featured soloist with several notable ensembles, including the Milwaukee American Legion Band and Ada Leonard's all-female band, and later established a career as a music educator in Hollywood, California.

== Early life ==
Evelyn Marie Pennak was born on April 4, 1915, in Milwaukee, Wisconsin, to William Henry Pennak and Ella S. Clemeson. She was raised alongside her older brother, Robert William Pennak (1912–2004), who later became a prominent zoologist and professor at the University of Colorado. Pennak demonstrated early musical proficiency on the saxophone. In 1931, at the age of 16, she was featured on the cover of the sheet music for "Evelyn," a composition written in her honor by prominent bandmaster Vesey Walker and published by Rayner, Dalheim in Chicago.

== Musical career ==
Pennak gained international recognition in the 1930s playing under the direction of Vesey Walker. She toured Europe with the Milwaukee American Legion Band, which won the world championship at an international professional band contest in Geneva, Switzerland. During this competition, Pennak was awarded an international trophy recognizing her as the "world's best saxophone player."

By 1940, federal census records show Pennak had relocated to Los Angeles, California. On June 6, 1939, she performed as a featured solo artist with the Sheriff's Boys' Band in the first band concert ever held at the Hollywood Bowl. Throughout the 1940s, she continued to perform in the big band circuit, notably playing with Ada Leonard's all-female band. On May 6, 1947, she played tenor saxophone in a recorded Hollywood studio session alongside notable musicians including Herbie Haymer. Her historical contributions to jazz saxophone are documented on compilation albums, including Women In Jazz: Swingtime To Modern Volume 3 (Stash Records, 1978) and Jazz Ladies 1924-1962 (Frémeaux & Associés).

== Later life and legacy ==
In her later years, Pennak settled in Southern California, operating a music store in Hollywood and working as a music teacher. Among her notable early students was Ken Ishii, who later became the cellist for Steve Reich's ensemble. She was an avid sailor and resided in Newport's Back Bay in Orange County, California.

On March 8, 1986, Pennak was formally honored at the "Tribute to the Pioneer Women Musicians" held at the Ambassador Hotel in Los Angeles, which celebrated the contributions of female musicians from the early 20th century. Pennak died on December 21, 1994, in Los Angeles, California.
